Tommys is a dansband from  Vaasa, established in 1980. Hans Martin was the singer from establishment until the year 2000. During the 1980s, the band mostly played throughout Ostrobothnia, and Swedish-speaking parts of southern Finland. In Sweden, the breakthrough was their 1991 hit "Vår dotter".

Discography
Sommarhälsning - 1988
En ny glädje - 1989
De tusen sjöars land - 1990
Ensamhet - 1991
Hyllning till far och mor - 1992
Som en vårnatt - 1994
Lyckans land - 1997
En liten blomma - 1997
Som vita duvor - 1998
Min kärlek blommar än - 1999
Till en vän - 2000
Aftonstjärnan - 2001
Tommys bästa (2CD) - 2001
I kväll ska vi ha fest - 2003
En dag i taget - 2006
Stunder av lycka - 2006
Big-5 - 2010
Spegelbild (30 år) - 2011
Sjömannen och stjärnan - 2012
Nånting - 2013
Kära mor - 2015
Våga Vinna - 2018
Tillsammans - 2020

Svensktoppen hits
Min kärlek blommar än - 1998-1999
I kväll ska vi ha fest - 2001

References

External links
Tommys 

Dansbands
1980 establishments in Finland
Musical groups established in 1980
Vaasa
Finnish musical groups